Term of Subtropical and Subtropics refer to:

Subtropics
Humid subtropical climate
Subtropical ridge
Subtropical High
Subtropical cyclone
Subtropical front
Subtropical jet
Subtropics (journal)